Yves Durand (born 6 June 1946 in Ambrières-les-Vallées) is a French politician, a member of the National Assembly.  He represents the Nord department,  and is a member of the Socialiste, radical, citoyen et divers gauche.

On 28 February 2013, The Commission des affaires culturelles et de l’éducation, of which Durand is part, voted in favour of an amendment proposed by Martine Faure, and favoured by Durand, Martine Martinel and Marie-George Buffet among others, that replaced the biological concepts of "sex", with the sociological concepts of "gender" in the national elementary curriculum. The elementary curriculum was successfully revised in September 2013 under the name "l'ABCD de l'egalite".

References

1946 births
Living people
People from Mayenne
Socialist Party (France) politicians
Deputies of the 12th National Assembly of the French Fifth Republic
Deputies of the 13th National Assembly of the French Fifth Republic
Deputies of the 14th National Assembly of the French Fifth Republic